Chicken Republic is a Nigerian fast-food chain and franchise that specializes in chicken recipes, especially fried chicken. It was founded by Deji Akinyanju, and the first restaurant was established in Apapa, Lagos in 2004.

Overview

Chicken Republic is headquartered in Lagos, Nigeria. The company is a subsidiary of Food Concepts Plc, a Nigerian food based company.

The company is arguably Nigeria's largest chicken restaurant chain with over 40 outlets in Lagos and over 190 outlets nationwide. Chicken Republic has also expanded services to other West African countries including Ghana.

References

External links
 

Restaurants in Lagos
Restaurants established in 2004
Fast-food chains of Nigeria
Fast-food poultry restaurants
Multinational food companies
Nigerian companies established in 2004
Multinational companies based in Lagos